Carnarvon was an electoral district of the Legislative Assembly in the Australian state of Queensland that existed from 1873 to 1992.

The district took in rural areas in southern Queensland, including the towns of Stanthorpe and Goondiwindi.

Members for Carnarvon

Election results

See also
 Electoral districts of Queensland
 Members of the Queensland Legislative Assembly by year
 :Category:Members of the Queensland Legislative Assembly by name

References

Former electoral districts of Queensland
1873 establishments in Australia
Constituencies established in 1873
Constituencies disestablished in 1992
1992 disestablishments in Australia